Bedwas railway station served the village of Bedwas, Monmouthshire, Wales, from 1865 to 1965 on the Brecon and Merthyr Tydfil Junction Railway.

History 
The station opened on 14 June 1865 by the Brecon and Merthyr Tydfil Junction Railway. It closed to passengers on 31 December 1962 and closed to goods traffic on 6 April 1965.

References

External links 

Disused railway stations in Monmouthshire
Former Brecon and Merthyr Tydfil Junction Railway stations
Railway stations in Great Britain opened in 1865
Railway stations in Great Britain closed in 1962
1865 establishments in Wales
1965 disestablishments in Wales